Eva Viehmann (born in 1980)  is a German mathematician who holds a professorial chair in the arithmetic geometry and representation theory research group at the University of Münster. Before that she was a professor working on arithmetic geometry at the Technical University of Munich.

She earned her habilitation in 2010, and in 2012 was appointed to her professorship at the Technical University of Munich.

Viehmann won the 2012 von Kaven Award in mathematics of the Deutsche Forschungsgemeinschaft for her work on the Langlands program.
She was an invited speaker at the 2018 International Congress of Mathematicians, speaking in the section on Lie Theory and Generalizations.
She was also the Emmy Noether Lecturer of the German Mathematical Society in 2018. In 2021 she became a member of the German Academy of Sciences Leopoldina.

References

Living people
21st-century German mathematicians
Women mathematicians
Academic staff of the Technical University of Munich
University of Bonn alumni
1980 births
German women mathematicians
Members of the German Academy of Sciences Leopoldina
21st-century German women